Medicine Creek is a  tributary of the Republican River in Nebraska. A state park and recreational area is located around the dam and lower portion of the reservoir. Medicine Creek is spring fed. Water quality is good and quantity is reliable. 

Medicine Creek flows through mixed grass prairies, intermediate between the tallgrass prairie to the east the shortgrass prairie (steppe) to the west. Forests are found in the stream bottoms along Medicine Creek and its tributaries. Cambridge, with a population of about 1,000 in 2020, is the largest town in the basin of Medicine Creek.

"Medicine" as a name applied to geographic features is fairly common in the western United States for places associated with Native Americans (Indians). Medicine Creek was a well-watered and wooded corridor between the Republican and Platte Rivers dating from pre-historic times. A band of Oglala Dakota called the Cut-off Oglala took up residence near Stockville in 1870. In the same year white cattlemen began to settle near the creek. In fall 1872, the Oglala chief Whistler and two more Oglala were murdered, probably by white bison hunters, and in 1873-1874 the Oglala departed the valley to reside on a reservation.

Archaeology
A  portion of Medicine Creek around the reservoir and extending up Lime Creek, a tributary, has been an area of extensive archaeological research since the 1920s.   Findings include fossils of extinct mammoths, evidence of Clovis Culture and pre-Clovis Paleo-Indians, and many sites associated with the prehistoric Plains Village period from roughly 1000 to 1450 CE. The Mowry Bluff Archeological Site, is located below the dam and is listed in the National Register of Historic Places.

See also

List of rivers of Nebraska

References

External links
 USGS - Water Resources of the United States 

Rivers of Nebraska
Rivers of Furnas County, Nebraska
Archaeological sites in Nebraska
Rivers of Lincoln County, Nebraska